Pablo Sanz may refer to:
 (1932–2012), Spanish actor in films such as Carnival Day
Pablo Sanz (footballer, born 1973), Spanish assistant football manager and former football midfielder
Pablo Sanz (footballer, born 1995), Spanish football forward